Separate Vacations is a Canadian sex comedy film, directed by Michael Anderson and released in 1986. The film stars David Naughton and Jennifer Dale as Richard and Sarah Moore, a long-married couple whose relationship has become unfulfilling, who agree to take separate vacations in order to explore whether they want to stay together or break up and see other people.

The film's cast also includes Lally Cadeau, Laurie Holden, Tony Rosato, Jay Woodcroft, Sherry Miller and Harvey Atkin.

Cadeau received a Genie Award nomination for Best Supporting Actress at the 7th Genie Awards.

References

External links

1986 films
Canadian sex comedy films
English-language Canadian films
Films directed by Michael Anderson
Films scored by Stanley Myers
Films scored by Hans Zimmer
1980s English-language films
1980s Canadian films